Ralph Dayton Cole (November 30, 1873 – October 15, 1932) was an American lawyer and politician who served three terms as a U.S. Representative from Ohio from 1905 to 1911. He was the brother of Raymond Clinton Cole, who also served in Congress.

Biography

Early years

Ralph Cole was born in Vanlue, Ohio on November 30, 1873. Cole had attended public school before enrolling in  Findlay College of Findlay, Ohio, from which he graduated in 1896.

From 1897 to 1899, Cole served as the deputy clerk of Hancock County, Ohio. During this period he also began to study law, attending Ohio Northern University College of Law.

Cole was admitted to the bar in 1900 and commenced practice in Findlay, Ohio.

Political career

He served as member of the Ohio House of Representatives from 1900 to 1904.

Cole was elected as a Republican to the Fifty-ninth, Sixtieth, and Sixty-first Congresses (March 4, 1905 – March 3, 1911).
He was an unsuccessful candidate for renomination in 1910 to the Sixty-second Congress.
He resumed the practice of law in Findlay, Toledo, and Columbus, Ohio.
Legal adviser to the Comptroller of the Currency in 1912 and 1913.
Cole served as chairman of the speakers' bureau for the Republican National Committee in 1916. He was also chosen as a delegate to the Republican National Conventions in 1916, 1924, and 1928.

Military service

Cole enlisted in the United States Army on June 6, 1917, serving overseas as major and lieutenant colonel in the 37th Infantry Division, taking part in many major engagements.

Following the termination of hostilities, Cole became one of the founders of the American Legion at Paris on February 15, 1919.

He was honorably discharged from the service April 6, 1919 and thereafter returned to civilian life.

Death and legacy

Sustained serious injuries in an automobile accident near Parkman, Ohio, from which he died in Warren, Ohio, on October 15, 1932. He was interred in Maple Grove Cemetery, Findlay, Ohio.

References

Sources

1873 births
1932 deaths
People from Hancock County, Ohio
University of Findlay alumni
Claude W. Pettit College of Law alumni
Republican Party members of the Ohio House of Representatives
United States Army personnel of World War I
Ohio lawyers
Road incident deaths in Ohio
United States Army officers
Republican Party members of the United States House of Representatives from Ohio